The Deadly Streets is a collection of short stories published by author Harlan Ellison in 1958.

The stories explore the violent themes Ellison experienced as part of the street gang The Barons when he was researching Web of the City.

Contents
The table of contents for Ace's 1983 edition are as follows:
 New Introduction(1983): Avoiding Dark Places
 Introduction to First Edition(1958): Some Sketches of the Damned
 Rat Hater
 "I'll Bet You a Death"
 We Take Care of Our Dead
 The Man With the Golden Tongue
 Johnny Slice's Stoolie
 Joy Ride
 Buy Me That Blade
 The Hippie-Slayer
 Kid Killer
 With a Knife in Her Hand
 Sob Story (written with Henry Slesar)
 Look Me in the Eye, Boy!
 The Dead Shot
 Ship-Shape Pay-Off (written with Robert Silverberg)
 Made in Heaven
 Students of the Assassin

1958 short story collections
Short story collections by Harlan Ellison
Ace Books books